Jakob Forsbacka Karlsson (born 31 October 1996) is a Swedish former professional ice hockey player, who most recently played for Färjestad BK of the Swedish Hockey League (SHL). Forsbacka Karlsson was drafted by the Boston Bruins in the second round (45th overall) of the 2015 NHL Entry Draft.

Playing career
For the 2013–14 season, Forsbacka Karlsson moved to North America to play with the Omaha Lancers of the United States Hockey League (USHL). During the 2014–15 season, Forsbacka Karlsson led the Lancers in scoring with 53 points in 50 games. He was selected to participate in the 2014 CCM/USA Hockey All-American Prospects Game where he was named his team's the most valuable player.

Forsbacka Karlsson committed to play the 2015–16 season with Boston University, and following the 2016–17 Terriers' run for the 2017 NCAA Division I Men's Ice Hockey Tournament, as announced on 2 April 2017, Forsbacka Karlsson signed a three-year, entry-level contract with the Boston Bruins. Following a call up from the Providence Bruins to Boston to help bolster the Bruins' injury-riddled lineup in November 2018, Forsbacka Karlsson scored his first NHL goal on 17 November 2018, in a 2–1 loss the Arizona Coyotes.

Having completed his entry-level contract at the conclusion of the 2018–19 season, Forsbacka Karlsson split the season between Boston and Providence, establishing new career marks in the NHL with 9 points in 28 games.

As an impending restricted free agent, and with the Bruins in the midst of their playoff run to the Stanley Cup Finals, Forsbacka Karlsson opted to pause his NHL career and return to Sweden after six years, citing family reasons. He signed a two-year contract in the SHL with the Växjö Lakers on 21 May 2019.

International play

Forsbacka Karlsson helped Swedish team win the gold medal at the 2013 World U-17 Hockey Challenge. He also competed with Sweden at both the 2013 and 2014 IIHF World U18 Championships.

Career statistics

Regular season and playoffs

International

Awards and honors

References

External links
 

1996 births
Boston Bruins draft picks
Boston Bruins players
Boston University Terriers men's ice hockey players
Living people
Omaha Lancers players
Providence Bruins players
Ice hockey people from Stockholm
Swedish ice hockey centres
Växjö Lakers players